Suraj Bhan (1 October 1928 – 6 August 2006) was a former Governor, Member of Parliament and an Indian politician from Bharatiya Janata Party.

Personal life 
Suraj Bhan Banswal was born on 1 October 1928 at Mehlanwali, Yamuna Nagar district of Haryana into Chamar community and studied MA and LLB at Panjab University and Kurukshetra University.

He started his public life as a volunteer of the Rashtriya Swayamsevak Sangh. His son Arun Kumar is also associated with BJP and been in-charge in various municipal corp. elections in Hayana.

Political career
He started his political career with Bharatiya Jana Sangh which eventually became the Bharatiya Janata Party and dropped his last name "Banswal" after joining active politics.
He represented the Ambala parliamentary constituency of Haryana in the 4th (1967–1970), 6th (1977–1979), 7th (1979–1984) and the 11th Lok Sabhas (1996–1997).
In 1987, he was elected to Haryana Legislative Assembly and served as Revenue Minister in Devi Lal's govt. (1987-1989). After the BJP broke alliance with Devi Lal's party, he served as Leader of Opposition in the Haryana Assembly (1989–1990).
He was appointed as Haryana State President of Bharatiya Janata Party in 1984.
In 1996, he held the portfolio of Agriculture Minister under First Vajpayee Ministry after which he served as Deputy Speaker of Lok Sabha (1996-1997).
He lost in 1998 Lok Sabha elections, but was appointed as the Governor of Uttar Pradesh (1998-2000), Himachal Pradesh (2000-2003), and then as Governor of Bihar (1999).
In 2002 Dr Suraj Bhan also joined the race for the post of Vice-President of India following re-thinking in the BJP over the candidature of former Rajasthan Chief Minister, Bhairon Singh Shekhawat.
In Feb. 2004, he was appointed as the National Chairman of Scheduled Castes and Scheduled Tribes Commission.

He died of cardiac arrest following multiple organ failure on 6 August 2006 in New Delhi at the age of 77.

References

External links
 https://web.archive.org/web/20060101023238/http://www.upgovernor.nic.in/bhanbio.htm

Bharatiya Janata Party politicians from Haryana
Governors of Himachal Pradesh
Governors of Uttar Pradesh
1928 births
2006 deaths
Janata Party politicians
People from Yamunanagar district
Deputy Speakers of the Lok Sabha
Kurukshetra University alumni
India MPs 1967–1970
India MPs 1977–1979
India MPs 1980–1984
India MPs 1996–1997
Agriculture Ministers of India
Chairmans of the National Commission for Scheduled Castes
Lok Sabha members from Haryana
Bharatiya Jana Sangh politicians
State cabinet ministers of Haryana
Recipients of the Padma Bhushan in literature & education